is a former Japanese football player. His younger brother Yoshiaki Ota is also footballer.

Playing career
Ota was born in Hamamatsu on July 23, 1981. He joined J1 League club Shimizu S-Pulse from youth team in 2000. However he could not play at all in the match. In 2001, he moved to J2 League club Ventforet Kofu on loan. He became a regular player as forward and scored 11 goals which is top scorer in the club. In 2002, he returned to Shimizu S-Pulse. He debuted in J1 League in 2002 and his opportunity to play increased in 2003. In 2004, he became a regular player as right midfielder. However he could hardly play in the match from 2006. In July 2007, he moved to Kashiwa Reysol. He became a regular player as right midfielder immediately and he played in all 34 matches in 2008. However his opportunity to play decreased in 2009. In July 2009, he moved to JEF United Chiba. Although he played many matches in 2009, the club was relegated to J2 first time in the club history from 2010. Although he became a regular player, he played many matches until 2011. In 2012, he moved to J2 club Tokushima Vortis. He played many matches in 2 seasons and the club was promoted to J1 first time in the club history from 2014. However he moved to J2 club FC Gifu in 2014 without playing J1. Although he played many matches in 2014, his opportunity to play decreased in 2015 and he retired end of 2015 season.

Club statistics

References

External links

1981 births
Living people
Association football people from Shizuoka Prefecture
Japanese footballers
J1 League players
J2 League players
Shimizu S-Pulse players
Ventforet Kofu players
Kashiwa Reysol players
JEF United Chiba players
Tokushima Vortis players
FC Gifu players
Association football midfielders